"Downfall" is a song by American alternative metal band Trust Company. It is the lead single from their 2002 debut album The Lonely Position of Neutral. "Downfall" peaked at No. 6 on both the Billboard Mainstream Rock Tracks and Modern Rock Tracks charts. It is one of the band's most well-known songs.

Style
"This song pretty much sums up who we are as far as music, it mixes heavy riffs with softer vocals which can sometimes also get heavy to match the riffs," said an unidentified band member in an email interview in 2002.

Music video
The video features frontman Kevin Palmer walking down a street, leaving everything he walks past being blown by a massive gust of wind. It found significant airplay on MTV2.

Media appearances
"Downfall" appears in the Mercy Reef pilot teaser. It also appears in the video games BMX XXX, Disney's Extreme Skate Adventure, NFL Blitz Pro and MX Unleashed. "Downfall" was made as a downloadable song in music rhythm game Rock Band on March 2, 2010. "Downfall" was used as the main theme for Vengeance (2002). Meanwhile, its B-side "Falling Apart" was used for the Royal Rumble (2003) pay-per-view.

Track listing

References

2002 singles
2002 songs
Geffen Records singles
Trust Company (band) songs
Music videos directed by Marcos Siega